Eric L. Watkins (born 18 March 1880 - 14 August 1949) was a New Zealand rugby footballer who represented New Zealand in both rugby union and rugby league.

Early years
Watkins attended Wellington College and was a surveyor by profession. This job often took him around the country.

Rugby Football
Watkins started playing rugby union for the Wellington College Old Boys' Club. He represented Wellington from 1900 to 1906 and the North Island in 1904 and 1906. Watkins was part of the Wellington sides that both won the Ranfurly Shield in 1904 and lost it in 1905. In 1907, when his work took him north to Raetihi, Watkins played in the local competition and represented Wanganui.

Watkins was selected for the All Blacks in 1905 for a test match against Australia. The match occurred while "The Originals" were in transit to Great Britain and thus unavailable for selection but was still given test match status by the New Zealand Rugby Union.

Rugby League
In 1907 Watkins joined the professional All Blacks in their tour of Great Britain and Australia. Like all other members of the touring party, Watkins received a life ban from the New Zealand Rugby Union. Watkins suffered a serious injury while training and did not play in Britain. While in Australia Watkins played in one test match.

Like five other members of the touring party Watkins is buried at Karori Cemetery.

References

External links

1880 births
1948 deaths
New Zealand international rugby union players
Dual-code rugby internationals
People educated at Wellington College (New Zealand)
New Zealand national rugby league team players
New Zealand rugby league players
New Zealand rugby union players
Wellington rugby union players
New Zealand surveyors
North Island rugby union players
Sportspeople from Akaroa
Burials at Karori Cemetery
Rugby league hookers